Sardar Mohammad Azim Khan Barakzai was a Pashtun noble who served as Afghan governor of Kashmir (1812–1819). He was the second son of the Barakzai chief Payinda Sarfaraz Khan, while his elder brother Fateh Khan was kingmaker and Vizier to Mahmud Shah Durrani. He was one of 21 brothers from eight mothers including his half-brother Dost Mohammad Khan who would later become Emir of Afghanistan.

Battle and Wars
(Battle of Nowshera) was fought against the Sikh Empire.
(Stratagem of Peshawar) was fought against the Nawab of Amb , Mir Nawab Khan Tanoli.

Career
In 1810, Mohd. Azim Khan was tasked by Mahmud Shah Durrani to capture his rival for the throne, Shah Shujah Durrani, who had raised an army of partisans in Peshawar. He successfully defeated Shah Shuja's armies and was subsequently involved in the 1812-13 joint Afghan-Sikh capture of Kashmir from its rebellious governor Mohd. Atta Khan Bamzai. He was appointed governor of Kashmir and in 1814 successfully repelled an attempted invasion by the Sikhs led by Ranjit Singh.

After the blinding and murder of Fatteh Khan by Shahzada Kamran Durrani, Mohd. Azim Khan became Barakzai chief and along with his brothers swore revenge against the Emir. All former Durrani empire provinces except Herat came under Barakzai control and he set himself up as Governor of Kabul having left Kashmir in the hands of his half-brother Jabbar Khan Navab. He invited Shah Shujah Durrani back from exile but installed Ayub Shah Durrani as puppet ruler instead.

In the summer of 1819 his half-brother Yar Mohd. Khan, governor of Peshawar, failed to impede Ranjit Singh on his march towards Kashmir and the Sikhs annexed the province after defeating Jabbar Khan in the Battle of Shopian. He attempted but failed to secure an alliance with the British while trying to secure his wealth and political position against his brothers, other Afghan nobles, the Sikhs and neighbouring rulers.

In March 1823, Azim Khan alongside other Pashtuns faced off against the Sikh Khalsa Army of Ranjit Singh at the Battle of Nowshera near Peshawar. After being repulsed on the first day he abandoned his allies, who had regrouped to continue fighting and retreated to Kabul where he died shortly thereafter. As a result, the Afghans lost their former stronghold of Peshawar Valley to the Sikh Empire.

He was reputed to have acquired great wealth through war plunder and excessive taxation, especially during his time as governor of Kashmr. His son Habiballah Khan inherited his estate and took control of Kabul after his death but was soon ousted by Dost Mohammad Khan.

References

Bibliography 

Pashtun people
Governors of Kashmir
Governors of provinces of Afghanistan
Year of death unknown
Year of birth unknown